Francis Murray may refer to:

 Francis Murray (mayor) (1838–1872), alderman and mayor of Brisbane, Australia
 Francis Edwin Murray (1854–1932), poet
 Francis Joseph Murray (1911–1996), mathematician
 Franny Murray (Francis Thomas Murray, 1915–1998), American football player